Behnaz Taherkhani (born 22 May 1995) is an Iranian footballer who plays as a defender for Kowsar Women Football League club Bam Khatoon and the senior Iran women's national team.

International goals

References 

1995 births
Living people
Iranian women's footballers
Iran women's international footballers
Footballers at the 2010 Summer Youth Olympics
Women's association football defenders
People from Takestan
21st-century Iranian women